Shiek Mordechai Synagogue, was a Sephardic Jewish synagogue in the Armenian capital Yerevan. Up until 1924, Shiek Mordechai was a leading institution and center of communal Jewish life for Jews in Armenia.

History 
The Jewish community in Armenia has a history of 2,000 years, when first Jewish groups settled in Armenia after the destruction of Solomon's Temple in Jerusalem.

From 1840, two groups of Jews existed in Armenia, Ashkenazis from the Russian Empire and Sephardis from Persia. Both communities had their own separate houses of worship and community leaders. The Shiek Mordechai Synagogue began operating in 1860 to serve the Persian Sephardic population of Yerevan. The Persian language was used along with Hebrew in prayer at the Synagogue. The Synagogue remained in use until 1924 when it was destroyed during the anti-religious politices of the Soviet Union.

Currently, the Jewish population in Armenia is around only around 500–1,000 with a single synagogue serving Yerevan. The Mordechai Navi Synagogue is said to have gotten its name from the earlier Shiek Mordechai Synagogue.

See also 
History of the Jews in Armenia

References

Jewish Armenian history
Synagogues in Armenia
Buildings and structures in Yerevan